John Skidmore Gilchrist (5 September 1939 – 13 August 1991) was a Scottish footballer who played as a right back in the Football League.

Career
Born in Wishaw, Scotland, Gilchrist played for Millwall between 1960 and 1969 making just under 300 appearances. He also played for Fulham and Colchester United in the Football League.

His younger brother Enoch was also a footballer.

Honours

Club
Millwall
Football League Fourth Division: 1961–62

Colchester United
Watney Cup: 1971

References

External links
 
 John Gilchrist at Colchester United Archive Database

1939 births
1991 deaths
Scottish footballers
Association football fullbacks
Bellshill Athletic F.C. players
Airdrieonians F.C. (1878) players
Millwall F.C. players
Fulham F.C. players
Colchester United F.C. players
Tonbridge Angels F.C. players
English Football League players
Scottish Football League players
Sportspeople from Wishaw
Scottish Junior Football Association players
Footballers from North Lanarkshire